Plaisance-du-Sud is a commune in the Anse-à-Veau Arrondissement, in the Nippes department of Haiti.

References

Populated places in Nippes
Communes of Haiti